Cavalry is a 1936 American Western film produced by A.W. Hackel, written and directed by Robert N. Bradbury and starring his son Bob Steele.

Plot
Following General Lee's surrender, Colonel Lafe Harvey, CSA returns to the family plantation to inform his niece Betty Lee that her father, General John Harvey, CSA was killed in a river during a battle. At that moment former guerillas have turned to brigandage where they attack and burn the plantation. Col. Harvey shoots one of them who attempt to attack a female slave. After the skirmish, where their plantation home has been burned to the ground, the Colonel and Betty Lee inform the freed slaves that they will take a wagon train to the West.

Shortly afterwards, Union Army Lieutenant Ted Thorn brings a blinded General Harvey home, as one last favour, the General asks Ted the inform his brother and his daughter of his return. The General does not know the man who saved his life was a Union officer until one of the ex-slaves tells him so.

Lt. Thorn meets President Abraham Lincoln who promotes him to Captain in the US Army and sends him on an undercover mission to stop a new republic from being formed in the West. The same former guerrillas who burned the Harvey plantation are amongst the plotters who consort with the Indians to act as a buffer state for them.

Cast
 Bob Steele as Captain Ted Thorn
 Frances Grant as Betty Lee Harvey (Holbrook)
 Karl Hackett as Gavin Rance
 Hal Price as Horace Leeds
 Earle Ross as Colonel Lafe Harvey (Holbrook)
 Ed Cassidy as Henchman Bart Haines
 William Welsh as General John Harvey
 Budd Buster as Wagon Boss Jake / President Lincoln

Soundtrack
 Plantation workers in Kentucky - "Massa's Gone Away"
 Wagon train group - "Old Folks at Home"

See also
Bob Steele filmography

External links
 
 

1936 films
1936 Western (genre) films
American Western (genre) films
American black-and-white films
Republic Pictures films
Films with screenplays by George H. Plympton
Films directed by Robert N. Bradbury
1930s English-language films
1930s American films